Edøy Church is a parish church of the Church of Norway in Smøla Municipality in Møre og Romsdal county, Norway.  It is located in the village of Edøy on the southern coast of the island of Smøla.  It is the main church for the Edøy parish which is part of the Ytre Nordmøre prosti (deanery) in the Diocese of Møre. The white, wooden church was built in a long church style in 1885 by the architects Jacob Digre and Johan Digre. The church seats about 365 people.

History

The church was built in to replace the medieval Old Edøy Church as the main church for the municipality of Edøy. The old church was on the island of Edøya, but this new church was built on the main island of Smøla to be closer to the majority of the parish's population. The church was completed on 21 August 1885 and on 18 September 1885 the church was consecrated. The new wooden long church has a rectangular nave and a smaller, rectangular chancel. There is a small sacristy on the east end of the chancel. In 1942, the entrance on the west end was enlarged.

See also
List of churches in Møre

References

Smøla
Churches in Møre og Romsdal
Wooden churches in Norway
Long churches in Norway
19th-century Church of Norway church buildings
Churches completed in 1885
1885 establishments in Norway